Lucilianus or Lucillianus may refer to:
 Lucilianus, a Coptic saint
 Lucillianus (fleet commander)
 Lucillianus (magister equitum), father-in-law of the Roman emperor Jovian
 Egnatius Lucillianus, Roman governor of Britannia Inferior in the 3rd century AD